Piatto is a comune (municipality) in the Province of Biella in the Italian region Piedmont, located about  northeast of Turin and about  northwest of Biella.

Piatto borders the municipalities of Bioglio, Callabiana, Camandona, Mosso, Quaregna, Ternengo, Valdengo, Vallanzengo, Valle San Nicolao and Veglio.

Demographic evolution

References

Cities and towns in Piedmont